Benajuy-ye Shomali Rural District is in the Central District of Bonab County, East Azerbaijan province, Iran. At the census of 2006, its population was 12,086 in 2,798 households; there were 11,884 inhabitants in 3,374 households at the following census of 2011; and in the most recent census of 2016, the population of the rural district was 12,262 in 3,828 households. The largest of its 11 villages was Zavosht, with 4,539 people.

References 

Bonab County

Rural Districts of East Azerbaijan Province

Populated places in East Azerbaijan Province

Populated places in Bonab County